= Ocean Gallery =

Art gallery in Ocean City, Maryland, US

Ocean Gallery in 1985.

The Ocean Gallery is an art gallery on the Ocean City Boardwalk in Worcester County, Maryland. The gallery was founded by Joe Kro-Art in 1972. He had moved to Ocean City in 1964. The gallery is owned by Joe Kro-Art along with his wife Adele and daughter Laura. At the age of eight, Kro-Art attended a scholarship program at Maryland Institute College of Art. In 2013, the gallery was featured in a Russian film, Turbo, directed by Anna Efranova. Kro-Art was featured in a documentary in 2020.
